Association Sportive Tiare Anani is a football club from Pao Pao, Moorea, French Polynesia. It currently competes in the Ligue 2 Moorea, the regional league of Moorea.

Last seasons

References

External links
Club's Facebook page

Football clubs in French Polynesia
Football clubs in Mo'orea